Korabl-Sputnik 3 ( meaning Ship-Satellite 3) or Vostok-1K No.3, also known as Sputnik 6 in the West, was a Soviet spacecraft which was launched in 1960. It was a test flight of the Vostok spacecraft, carrying two dogs; Pcholka and Mushka ("little bee" and "little fly"; affectionate diminutives of "pchela" and "mukha", respectively), as well as a television camera and scientific instruments.

Korabl-Sputnik 3 was launched at 07:30:04 UTC on 1 December 1960, atop a Vostok-L carrier rocket flying from Site 1/5 at the Baikonur Cosmodrome. It was successfully placed into low Earth orbit. The flight lasted one day, after which the spacecraft was deorbited ahead of its planned recovery. The deorbit burn began at 07:15 UTC on 2 December, however the engine did not cut off as planned at the end of the burn, and instead the spacecraft's fuel burned to depletion. This resulted in it reentering the atmosphere on a trajectory which might have permitted foreign powers to inspect the capsule. To prevent this, an explosive charge was detonated during reentry. Both Pchyolka and Mushka were killed in the resulting disintegration. They were the last dogs to die in a Soviet space mission, after Laika, who was never intended to survive her Sputnik 2 flight, and Chaika and Lisichka, perishing after the rocket carrying their "Korabl Sputnik" spacecraft disintegrated 20 seconds into the flight.

Three weeks later, a follow-up launch to Korabl-Sputnik 3 also failed. On 22 December, the dogs Damka and Krasavka lifted off from LC-1 using a booster with an enhanced Blok E stage which produced more thrust than the previous model. This variant (the 8K72K) would be used for manned Vostok launches. The strap-ons and core stage of the booster performed normally, but the untested new Blok E failed a few seconds after ignition when the gas generator malfunctioned. Since the engine could not produce sufficient thrust to achieve orbital velocity, the mission had to be aborted. The Vostok was ejected with the Blok E still firing and the dogs subjected to a rough ballistic reentry in freezing winter weather. Recovery crews frantically searched for the descent module before its automatic self-destruct mechanism activated, and after some hours, succeeded in disarming the mechanism and retrieving the dogs, which were returned to Baikonur Cosmodrome alive.

References

Korabl Sputnik 3
Spacecraft launched in 1960
1960 in the Soviet Union
December 1960 events